Bullioh Football Netball Club, nicknamed the Bulldogs, is an Australian rules football club which plays in the Upper Murray Football League. The club is based in Victorian district of Bullioh and plays its home games 13 km away at Wyeebo Recreation Reserve in the Victoria district of Tallangatta.

History

Prior to 1947 formation
 Bullioh FC est. 1928 (wore yellow and black colours)
 Leagues: "Tallangatta & District Football League" (1928-1946).
 Honours: None
 Tallangatta Valley est. 1909 (wore gold and black colours)
 Leagues: "Mitta Valley Football Association" (1909-1913); "Wodonga And District Football Association" (1914 - as "Federal Railway FC"); "Kiewa And District Football Association" (1921); "Tallangatta And District Football League" (1934).
 Honours: "Mitta Valley Football Association " premiers (1909, 1911, 1913).

Bullioh Valley Football Club (1947-1977)
The Bullioh Valley Football Club (as it was then known) was originally formed in 1947 as a result of a merger between the Tallangatta Valley and Bullioh football teams after WWII. The newly merged club participated in the Tallangatta & District Football League from 1947 until 1977. The club won its only Senior TDFL flag in 1950 when Bullioh Valley defeated Granya by one point. Despite the Bulldogs being Runners Up in 1976 it was apparent by the end of 1977 that both the Bullioh and nearby Tallangatta Football Club's would both struggle for survival unless steps were taken to remedy the situation. A merger between the two club's paved the way for the Tallangatta Valley Football Club to debut in the TDFL in 1978 with home games being shared between the two former clubs. The merged club was immediately successful winning flags in 1979 and 1980. However, by the early 1990s all home games were played at the Tallangatta football ground.

 Tallangatta & District Football League: Grand Finals
KEY: [?] = Details are still unclear or are missing.

 In 2009 the "Tallangatta Valley FNC" were renamed to the "Tallangatta FNC" no longer recognizing their connection to the "Bullioh Valley FC" after almost 10 years since the re-formation of the "Bullioh FNC".

Upper Murray Football Netball League
By 2000 a group of residents of the Bullioh community had decided it was time to reform the Bullioh Football Club. Although both the Tallangatta Valley and Cudgewa clubs protested their players would be poached and after it was initially turned down by the VCFL the club was granted the right to play in the Upper Murray Football League in 2001. That season they fielded senior, reserve and junior sides along with the formation of the Bullioh Netball Club. The senior side managed four victories in their inaugural season.

Since first taking to the field in the Upper Murray league Bullioh has been among the most successful clubs in country Victoria, making the finals in all but its first season and winning their maiden Upper Murray flag in 2004. Since the appointment of Mark Nichol as senior coach in 2007 the club has made 5 grand finals in a row. After finishing the home and away season in 2007 with only one loss the Bulldog's were shock losers to Federal in a near unbackable grand final. However, this only strengthened the club's resolve with the club now having won 4 premierships in succession (2008–2011).

See also
Australian rules football in Victoria
Australian rules football in New South Wales

References

External links
 Gameday website

Australian rules football clubs in Victoria (Australia)
Netball teams in Victoria (Australia)
Multi-sport clubs in Australia
1947 establishments in Australia